Astraea lobata is a flowering plant in the spurge family, Euphorbiaceae. It is native from Mexico south to Argentina.

References

Crotoneae
Plants described in 1753
Taxa named by Carl Linnaeus
Flora of North America
Flora of South America